SM U-34 was a German U-boat of World War I. Launched on 9 May 1914, U-34 sank a total of 119 ships during 17 combat patrols, while damaging another 5 ships. The vessel had three commanders during its time: Kptlt. Claus Rucker, Kptlt. Johannes Klasing, Kptlt. Wilhelm Canaris, and Klasing again, in that order. On 18 October 1918, U-34 sailed for the last time, disappearing with all 38 crew members lost.

Design
German Type U 31 submarines were double-hulled ocean-going submarines similar to Type 23 and Type 27 subs in dimensions and differed only slightly in propulsion and speed. They were considered very good high sea boats with average manoeuvrability and good surface steering.

The U-boat was armed with four  torpedo tubes, two fitted in the bow and two in the stern, and carried 6 torpedoes. Additionally U-34 was equipped in 1915 with one  Uk L/30 deck gun, which was replaced with a  gun in 1916/17.
The boat's complement was 4 officers and 31 enlisted.

Summary of raiding history

References

Notes

Citations

Bibliography

External links

Ships built in Kiel
World War I submarines of Germany
German Type U 31 submarines
U-boats commissioned in 1914
1914 ships
Missing U-boats of World War I
Maritime incidents in 1918